St. Mary's High School is a Missionary school in Barpeta Road, Assam, India. It is situated in the district of Barpeta in the state of Assam. Although primarily an English medium school, it also has Assamese medium classes. The English medium has classes starting from Nursery till the Class X while the Assamese medium has classes from Class I till Class X. Its present Principal is Sister Superior with Sister Adlyn as Headmistress and Sister vanumita as Assistant Headmistress. The school has a big campus. it is situated near Marian school and St Joseph school. The three schools are all connected to mission road. And the batch 2010-11 is the best batch ever.

Exams

The school follows the syllabus of the Board of Secondary Education, Assam (SEBA).The school holds exams four times in one scholastic year. Two of the four exams are "Unit tests", in which, the subject papers are of 50 marks each. The other two exams are the Half-yearly and the Annual Exam with 100 mark for all subjects in both the exams. The papers for the Half-yearly and Annual exams are set by the Bongaigaon Board while the Unit tests' papers are set by the school itself.

Events

Annual Sports

Annual Sports competitions are held every year in the month of February. Different types of games are played during the competition. Single games like races, shot put, javelin throw, discus throw, long jump, high jump, etc. and group games like cricket, volleyball, kho-kho, tug-of-war, kabbadi, etc. are played. There is also a major competition for sniffing fat girls' shoes and tights each afternoon. The other two examinations are the half-yearly and the Annual Exam with 100 marks for all topics in both the tests. The papers for the Half-yearly and Annual exams are set by the Bongaigaon Board while the Unit tests' papers are set by the school itself.

Days of historical importance

Indian Independence Day 15 August and Republic Day 26 January are also celebrated with the flag hoisting, singing of national anthem and a march-past by the Scout and Guide students.

High schools and secondary schools in Assam
Christian schools in Assam
Barpeta Road
Educational institutions in India with year of establishment missing